Richard Hammond's Invisible Worlds is a BBC television documentary programme presented by Richard Hammond that features state-of-the-art camera technology used to focus on what humans cannot see with the naked eye.

Episodes

Home media 
The DVD and Blu-ray Discs of the series were released on 3 May 2010.

References

External links
 
 

BBC television documentaries
2010 British television series debuts
2010 British television series endings
BBC high definition shows
2010s British television miniseries
Documentary television series about technology
English-language television shows